Manasi Rachh is an Indian actress and model. She made her debut in 2011 with the film Mujhse Fraaandship Karoge and was noted for her performance in the Karan Johar movie Student of the Year. She is also noted for her ads as well as her works in the theater.

Web series
Manasi Rachh recently appeared in a Web Series "It's Not That Simple (2018)" in as "Natasha (Nats)" aired on "Voot" with other featured cast Swara Bhaskar, Purab Kohli, Sumeet Vyas, Vivan Bhatena, Neha Chauhan, Karan Veer Mehra, Devika Vatsa, Rohan Shah, Jia Vaidya etc.
She also played Maddy in season 2 of the Indian TV series, 24.

Filmography

Films

TV series

Web series

References

External links
 
 

Living people
Indian film actresses
Indian television actresses
Indian web series actresses
Indian female models
Actresses in Hindi cinema
Actresses in Gujarati cinema
Actresses in Hindi television
Year of birth missing (living people)
21st-century Indian actresses